Thomas William Henry Harrison Moseley (November 28, 1813 – March 10, 1880) was a builder and designer of wrought-iron arch bridges. He is best known for his "Wrought-Iron Lattice Girder Bridge" patent of August 30, 1870. The only known surviving example of this type of bridge structure is the Hares Hill Road Bridge located in Chester County, Pennsylvania.

Biography
Thomas W.H. Moseley was born near Mt. Sterling, Kentucky on November 28, 1813. He died in Scranton, Pennsylvania on March 10, 1880. He was referred to at times as "Gen. Moseley" because of his time as state adjutant-general in Ohio in the 1840s to early 1850s. He got started in business in Cincinnati, Ohio in the 1850s, which is when Zenas King was on board. By 1861, T.W.H Moseley had made his move to Boston, Massachusetts, and Zenas King started his own company in Cleveland, Ohio. By the early 1870s Thomas Moseley was living in Pennsylvania; Philadelphia first, then in Scranton.

Patents

See also
 Hares Hill Road Bridge
 Moseley Wrought Iron Arch Bridge
 Moseley Iron Bridge and Roof Company

References

American civil engineers
American bridge engineers
1813 births
1880 deaths